The 1967 New Orleans Saints season was the inaugural season for the franchise.  The team went 3–11, finishing in last place in the four-team NFL Eastern Conference Capitol Division.

Offseason

Expansion draft

The Saints made a splash in the expansion draft by selecting Green Bay Packers running back Paul Hornung. Lombardi was distraught when the Saints selected Hornung in the draft. In later years, Hornung revealed that he spoke to Saints coach Tom Fears prior to the draft. Fears was a former assistant in Green Bay and Fears felt that Hornung would help sell tickets in New Orleans. Several weeks later, the Saints also signed Packers running back Jim Taylor, a native of Baton Rouge and an All-American at LSU. Taylor had felt underpaid and under-appreciated under Lombardi. An examination at the Scripps Clinic in California found the severing of the fifth, sixth, and seventh vertebrae, and damaged nerve roots in the spinal cord of Hornung. It was decided that Hornung would retire and he never played a game for the Saints.

NFL draft

The Saints committed a colossal blunder by trading the first overall selection to the Baltimore Colts for Gary Cuozzo, the backup quarterback to Johnny Unitas. Cuozzo began the season as the Saints' starter, but lost the job to expansion draftee Billy Kilmer. Cuozzo was traded to the Minnesota Vikings early in 1968. 

Baltimore selected Michigan State All-America defensive end Bubba Smith with the first pick. Smith became a star for the Colts, starting at left end for their Super Bowl III and Super Bowl V teams.

Personnel

Staff

Roster

Pre-season
The Saints played six pre-season games, finishing with a record of 5–1.

Regular season

Things couldn't have looked better for the Saints and their inaugural season. A 5–1 preseason record was followed by a 94-yard kickoff return for a touchdown by rookie John Gilliam to begin the 1967 season against the Los Angeles Rams. (There is a rumor in the annals of New Orleans Saints legends that following this play many fans allegedly heard another fan in Tulane Stadium shout out aloud "This is going to be the greatest football team in history!" – thus jinxing the Saints for their first 20 years of existence). Apparently the Rams were not informed of this declaration as they quickly recovered from the opening blow to win 27–13.
The first-ever win for the Saints came in week 8 when wide receiver Flea Roberts scored 3 touchdowns in a 31–24 victory over the Philadelphia Eagles. With additional triumphs over Atlanta and Washington the 3 wins for the year matched the most for an expansion team.
Former Green Bay great Jim Taylor led the team with 390 yards rushing and 17th round pick rookie Danny Abramowicz from Xavier College led in receiving with 50 grabs for 721 yards and 6 touchdowns. Defensive back Dave Whitshell led the team as well as the NFL in interceptions with 10 steals—still a New Orleans Saint season record.

Schedule

Game summaries

Week 1: vs. Los Angeles Rams

 Source:

Week 2: vs. Washington Redskins

 Source:

Week 3: vs. Cleveland Browns

 Source:

Week 4: at New York Giants

 Source:

Week 5: at Dallas Cowboys

 Source:

Week 6: at San Francisco 49ers

 Source:

Week 7: vs. Pittsburgh Steelers

 Source:

Week 8: vs. Philadelphia Eagles

 Source:

Week 9: vs. Dallas Cowboys

 Source:

Week 10: at Philadelphia Eagles

 Source:

Week 11: vs. Atlanta Falcons

 Source:

Week 12: at St. Louis Cardinals

 Source:

Week 13: at Baltimore Colts

 Source:

Week 14: at Washington Redskins

 Source:

Standings

References

External links
 New Orleans Saints History
 Saints on Pro Football Reference

New Orleans Saints
New Orleans Saints seasons
New Orl